Mohit Gupta is a professor of cardiology at GB Hospital and Maulana Azad Medical College in New Delhi. Gupta is associated with the Brahma Kumaris.

An artificial intelligence model developed by Indraprastha Institute of Information Technology (IIIT)-Delhi in collaboration with cardiologists from G B Pant Hospital and Harvard Medical School. Gupta was the principal investigator of the project. Delhi Doctors develop a system to prevent post-heart attack failure. This model has been specially designed for predicting the chances of a patient dying within 30 days of suffering a heart attack or surviving. In 2018, he was conferred with the Excellence in Cardiology by the Government of India for his work in the field of medicine. He resides in New Delhi, India. He is famous doctor in Delhi.

Reference links

External links 
 Mohit Gupta on Facebook

Living people
1974 births